Eucalyptus rummeryi, commonly known as steel box, Rummery's box or brown box, is a species of medium-sized to tall tree that is endemic to northern New South Wales. It has rough bark on the trunk and branches, lance-shaped to curved adult leaves, flower buds in groups of three or seven on the ends of branchlets, white flowers and conical, hemispherical or cup-shaped fruit.

Description
It has rough, fibrous or flaky, grey to black bark on the trunk and branches. Flowering occurs from November to December and the flowers are white.

Taxonomy and naming
Eucalyptus rummeryi was first formally described in 1923 by Joseph Maiden in his book A Critical Revision of the Genus Eucalyptus from material collected from Busby's Flat, near Casino by Edward George Rummery (1877–1958), (named as George Edward Rummery by Maiden) in 1921. The specific epithet (rummeryi) honours the collector of the type.

Distribution and habitat
Steel box grows on slopes and ridges in wet or grassy forest from Dorrigo to north-west of Casino.

References

rummeryi
Myrtales of Australia
Flora of New South Wales
Trees of Australia
Plants described in 1923